Time is the debut studio album by the Yugoslavian rock group Time, released in 1972 by Jugoton.

The album was polled in 1998 as the 3rd on the list of 100 greatest Yugoslav rock and pop albums in the book YU 100: najbolji albumi jugoslovenske rok i pop muzike (YU 100: The Best albums of Yugoslav pop and rock music).

Track listing

Personnel 
 Dado Topić - vocals; bass and acoustic guitar (track 3)
 Vedran Božić - guitar
 Tihomir "Pop" Asanović - keyboards, hammond organ; synthesizers and melloton (track 3)
 Brane Živković - Lambert - piano, flute
 Mario Mavrin - bass
 Ratko Divjak - drums; congas (track 3)

References 

1972 debut albums
Jugoton albums